Gerard de Baere, a native of Laarne, was the 43rd abbot of Ten Duinen Abbey in Bruges from 1653 to 1666.

Life
De Baere was professed as a monk in 1631. He was ordained subdeacon on 10 April 1632, deacon on 21 May 1633, and priest on 24 September 1633. A plan to have him nominated Bishop of Bruges failed to pan out.

On 11 May 1666 he granted permission for a chapel with portable altar to be built on the former site of Oosteeklo Abbey.

He died in Bruges on 26 October 1666.

References

1608 births
1666 deaths
Abbots of Dunes
Clergy of the Spanish Netherlands
People from Laarne